The National Women's Soccer League (NWSL) is a professional women's soccer league at the top of the United States league system. It is owned by the teams and, until 2020, was under a management contract with the United States Soccer Federation.

The NWSL was established in 2012 as the successor to Women's Professional Soccer (WPS; 2007–2012), which was itself the successor to Women's United Soccer Association (2001–2003). The league began play in 2013 with eight teams, four of which were former members of WPS (Boston Breakers, Chicago Red Stars, Sky Blue FC, and Western New York Flash).  it has 12 teams across the United States.

 five teams have been crowned NWSL Champions, awarded to the playoff winner; four teams have claimed the NWSL Shield, awarded to the team in first place at the end of the regular season; and three teams have been champions of the NWSL Challenge Cup, an annual league cup tournament that began in 2020. The current (2022) NWSL champions are the Portland Thorns FC, and the current shield winners (2022) are Seattle-based team OL Reign. The current (2022) Challenge Cup champions are the North Carolina Courage.

Competition format 
 the NWSL season runs from February to October, with the NWSL Challenge Cup taking place between March and May, followed by the regular season and playoffs. Each team is scheduled for 22 regular-season games in a home-and-away, double round-robin format. At the end of the regular season, the team with the highest point total is awarded the NWSL Shield. The six teams with the most points from the regular season qualify for the playoffs, with the top two teams receiving a first-round bye; the higher-seeded teams would host single knockout matches, with the semifinal winners advancing to the championship final played at a predetermined site.

The current playoff format began in 2021. Prior to 2021, the playoffs included only four teams. The number of regular-season matches had also fluctuated between 20 and 24 in past seasons.

In 2020, the league suspended the season before it started because of the global COVID-19 pandemic. Play resumed with the NWSL Challenge Cup tournament. Its success led the NWSL to make it an annual league cup competition.

History

Founding 
After Women's Professional Soccer (WPS) officially folded in April 2012, the United States Soccer Federation (US Soccer) announced a roundtable for discussion of the future of women's professional soccer in the United States.  The meeting, which included representatives from US Soccer, WPS teams, the W-League (ceased operation in 2015), and the Women's Premier Soccer League (WPSL), was held in June. By November, after much discussion, owners from the Chicago Red Stars, Boston Breakers and US Soccer recruited an additional six teams. Compared to WPS, the teams would intentionally operate at a lower cost structure and manage growth in a sustainable way.

In November 2012, it was announced that there would be eight teams in a new women's professional soccer league that was yet to be named at the time of the announcement, with national team players subsidized by US Soccer, the Canadian Soccer Association (CSA) and the Mexican Football Federation (FMF). The three federations would pay for the salaries of their national team players (24 from the US, 16 from Canada, and 12 to 16 from Mexico) to aid the teams in creating world-class rosters while staying under the salary cap. The players would be distributed evenly (as possible) among the eight teams in an allocation process. The teams would own the league, and the league would contract US Soccer to manage league operations. After the 2020 season, the league terminated its management contract with US Soccer.

On November 29, 2012, it was announced that Cheryl Bailey had been named executive director in the new league. Bailey had previously served as general manager of the United States women's national soccer team from 2007 to 2011, which included leading the support staff for the U.S. team during the 2007 and 2011 FIFA Women's World Cups, as well as the 2008 Summer Olympics. During her tenure with the women's national team, she was in charge of all areas of administration including interfacing with clubs, team travel, payroll, and working with FIFA, CONCACAF, and other federations.

Nike, Inc. was selected as league sponsor, providing apparel to all teams as well as the game ball.

Early years 
The first NWSL game was held on April 13, 2013, as the Portland Thorns visited FC Kansas City, playing to a 1–1 draw in front of a crowd of 6,784 fans at Shawnee Mission District Stadium. Renae Cuellar scored the first goal in league history. The 2013 season saw regular-season attendance average of 4,270, with a high of 17,619 on August 4 for Kansas City at Portland.

The NWSL became the first U.S. professional women's soccer league to reach nine teams with the addition of Houston Dash, backed by Major League Soccer (MLS) team Houston Dynamo, in 2014; expansion interest, particularly from MLS and USL teams, has continued. The third season saw a shortened schedule and some early-season roster instability due to the 2015 FIFA Women's World Cup in Canada, but the World Cup also provided exposure to the NWSL, which was credited with boosting attendance numbers across the league.

The league also became the first professional women's league in the US to play more than three seasons when the league kicked off its fourth season in 2016.

Response to COVID-19 pandemic 
The 2020 season was initially postponed due to the COVID-19 pandemic and later canceled. Instead the league played the 2020 NWSL Challenge Cup, a special competition hosted in the Salt Lake City region with no spectators. The cup began in late June, making the NWSL the first major U.S. team sports league to return to play. The league was the recipient of a federal loan through the Paycheck Protection Program, which it used to compensate players before the competition was able to begin. Later that year the league also played the NWSL Fall Series, a set of 18 games between teams within geographically restricted regions.

Teams

Current teams 

The 12 NWSL teams are spread across the United States. Each club is allowed a minimum of 20 players on their roster, with a maximum of 22 players (26 including supplemental players) allowed at any time during the season.

Originally, each team's roster included up to three allocated American national team players, up to two allocated Mexico women's national team players, and up to two allocated Canadian national team players via the NWSL Player Allocation and subsequent trades. In addition, each team has four spots each season available for international players; these spots may be traded to other teams. The remaining roster spots must be filled by domestic players from the United States. Teams fill their rosters via a number of drafts and 4–6 discovery player signings. Mexico no longer allocates players to the NWSL, having established its own women's league in 2017, and the numbers of allocated players and international players on each team vary each year due to trades. Effective with the 2022 season, the player allocation system has been abolished.

Of the 12 teams that will contest the 2023 season, three are affiliated with men's Major League Soccer teams, two are affiliated with men's teams of the United Soccer League, one is affiliated with a French Ligue 1 team (as well as its women's counterpart in the Division 1 Féminine), and six are independent.

Future teams

Former teams

Membership timeline

Expansion 

Soon after launch, the league reportedly planned to expand to ten teams for 2014. Potential candidates included groups not accepted as part of the original eight; groups from the Los Angeles area (joint effort from the LA Strikers and Pali Blues) and from Hartford, Connecticut, were confirmed failed bids, as was one from the Seattle Sounders Women. There was speculation that the Vancouver Whitecaps Women could be logical candidates especially given the 2015 FIFA Women's World Cup in Canada; however, the Whitecaps shuttered their women's program (except for one U-18 academy team) in December 2012.

During the inaugural season, there were rumors of expansion interest from MLS teams Toronto FC, Vancouver Whitecaps FC, and the New York Red Bulls, as well as confirmed interest from WPSL side the Houston Aces. NWSL team owners hinted that expansion for 2014 was not a question of "if" but "how many". Despite this, it was announced during the playoffs that there would be no expansion for the league's second season, though the Red Bulls and Sky Blue FC confirmed that they were in discussions for cooperation.

During the first offseason, the Houston Dynamo added their name to the list of MLS teams interested in fielding a women's side, stating that they were "exploring the opportunity" of starting an NWSL side in 2014 or '15 and in 2013 they announced the Houston Dash with 2014 as their inaugural season. By early December, NWSL approved a new team run by the Dynamo organization for expansion in 2014, despite their earlier statement that there would be no expansion for the league's second season.

During the second offseason, expansion talk grew rapidly, with three established men's teams (Real Salt Lake of MLS, the Indy Eleven of NASL, and the Pittsburgh Riverhounds of USL Pro) expressing interest in joining NWSL, as well as an unattached group from Atlanta.  There was also rumored or suggested interest from three men's teams in California, though none of those groups made official statements.  Despite this interest, it was announced in late April 2015 that there would be no expansion for the 2016 season.

However, after the well-publicized success of the US Women's National soccer team, renewed interest in NWSL expansion caused reports from the owners' meeting that "a new team in 2016 has not been ruled out", with potential expansion news to be revealed within a month. Commissioner Jeff Plush said that over a dozen interested groups had contacted the league in the post-World-Cup weeks; MLS team Orlando City SC was one of the first newly interested groups made public. On October 20, 2015, it was announced that Orlando would be hosting the 10th NWSL team, the Orlando Pride, due to start the 2016 season. At that announcement, the Pride announced that they had hired former U.S. National Women's Team coach Tom Sermanni.

On November 16, 2017, it was announced that Real Salt Lake would expand into the NWSL beginning in the 2018 season. The Salt Lake City team, shortly thereafter unveiled as Utah Royals FC, is officially considered a new franchise that replaced FC Kansas City. 

The NWSL announced on October 22, 2019, that a team in Louisville, Kentucky, affiliated with the city's USL Championship side Louisville City FC, would join the league in 2021. The team was originally to be named Proof Louisville FC, but after significant disapproval from fans it was announced that the Proof Louisville FC branding would not necessarily be the final selection, and that the process to determine the team's identity would be restarted. On July 8, 2020, the Louisville team was rebranded as Racing Louisville FC, and its associated visual identity was announced on the same day. Racing plays in Lynn Family Stadium, which opened in 2020 as the new home of Louisville City.

On July 21, 2020, the NWSL announced that a Los Angeles-based team will begin play in 2022. The team's ownership group, who call themselves "Angel City," is led by president and founder Julie Uhrman, a media and gaming entrepreneur; co-founders Natalie Portman, an Oscar-winning actress, and venture capitalist Kara Nortman; venture capitalist Alexis Ohanian as lead founding investor; and additional investors including fourteen former USWNT members, most with ties to Southern California; actresses Uzo Aduba, Jessica Chastain, America Ferrera, Jennifer Garner, and Eva Longoria; talk show host Lilly Singh; and Ohanian's wife, tennis great Serena Williams. In 2022, the Los Angeles NWSL team will be the first American professional sports team founded by a majority-woman ownership group to begin play, and co-founders Portman, Nortman, and Uhrman have publicly discussed their ownership stakes extensively as one way to address gender inequity in sports and to encourage additional investment by women into women's sports. On October 21, 2020, the ownership group announced that the expansion club would be called Angel City FC and announced more group members, among them tennis great Billie Jean King, WNBA star Candace Parker, alpine skiing great Lindsey Vonn and her fiancé at the time, NHL star P. K. Subban, actress and activist Sophia Bush, Latin music pop star Becky G, actor and TV host James Corden, and former US men's soccer international Cobi Jones.

On December 7, 2020, the NWSL announced that an expansion team in Kansas City would join the league in 2021 and take over player-related assets from the Utah Royals FC. The Royals ceased operations at the same time, but the new owners of Utah Soccer LLC (after Dell Loy Hansen completes the sale) would have the option of re-establishing the Royals franchise in 2023. The team played under the placeholder name of Kansas City NWSL in the 2021 season, announcing its permanent identity of Kansas City Current immediately before its final home game of that season on October 30.

On January 12, 2021, then-NWSL commissioner Lisa Baird shared in a press conference that an expansion team in Sacramento would join the league in 2022, but that the team ownership would make the official announcement in due course. A team announcement never materialized, however. In May 2021, it was reported that the ownership group behind the Sacramento expansion would be seeking NWSL approval to move its expansion rights to San Diego instead. On June 8, 2021, the NWSL officially announced a San Diego expansion team, ultimately named San Diego Wave FC, with former United States women's national soccer team head coach Jill Ellis as president.

In late 2022, it was reported the likely 13th expansion club would be in Utah, as the new Real Salt Lake ownership had the rights to an approximately $2 million expansion franchise fee to bring back the Utah Royals to the Salt Lake City Area. In addition the three finalists for the 14th expansion club were a group from the San Francisco Bay Area, Tampa, and Boston. It is thought these teams would join for the 2024 season. The highest bid was reported to be $40 million. On January 27, 2023, it was reported that the NWSL would expand to Utah, San Francisco and Boston. The owners in Utah would pay $2-5 million, while the groups in San Francisco and Boston would pay $50 million. Utah and San Francisco would join the NWSL in 2024 and Boston would join the NWSL later. On March 11, 2023, it was confirmed that the Utah team would join in 2024, inheriting the Utah Royals FC name and history.

Organization

Stadiums and attendance 

In the 2023 season, every NWSL team will use one stadium as its primary home venue after the Washington Spirit reached an agreement to play all home games at Audi Field.

The highest attendance in the league's history was on September 17, 2022, for San Diego Wave FC's opening game at the new Snapdragon Stadium against Angel City FC, which drew a sellout crowd of 32,000. This broke both of the league's previous single-game attendance records—the absolute record of 27,278 for OL Reign's match against the visiting Portland Thorns FC as part of a doubleheader with Seattle Sounders FC of MLS at Lumen Field, and the record for a standalone match (not part of a doubleheader with a men's team) of 25,218, achieved on August 11, 2019, at Portland's Providence Park in a game between the Thorns and the visiting North Carolina Courage.

, Angel City FC and Portland Thorns FC have respectively hosted four and three of the ten most-attended regular-season matches in league history (including ties for 10th), with the other four being San Diego Wave FC's Snapdragon Stadium opener, two doubleheader games hosted by OL Reign and Chicago Red Stars respectively, and Orlando Pride's first-ever home game in 2016.

Squad formation and salaries
In each season, teams receive a salary cap that limits their total spending on players. Before the 2022 season, salaries of federation players were paid for completely or mostly by their respective national federations, and they counted against the salary cap at a pre-determined amount—$33,000 for U.S. players, and $27,500 or the actual salary for Canadian players, whichever is lower. Non-federation players are subject to minimum and maximum salary limits.

Each team provides fully paid healthcare for its players, and also provides housing, either directly or through a stipend of no more than $3,000 per month. In addition, teams are allowed to provide their players with the use of a car valued at no more than $50,000. These expenses are specifically excluded from cap calculations.

In 2019, the maximum senior roster size was expanded to 22 and the minimum to 20, with an additional four supplemental spots for players earning minimum salary that do not count against the salary cap.  the minimum senior roster size is 22 and the maximum 24, so each team could carry a maximum total of 28 players on its active roster.

The NWSL introduced significant changes to its compensation guidelines before the 2020 season. In addition to a sizable increase in the salary cap and the salary limits for unallocated players, teams now can purchase up to $300,000 in "allocation money" in excess of the salary cap to invest in qualified current or future players; allocation money can be traded. Multi-year contracts (up to three years plus one option year) are now permitted, year-round housing becomes mandatory, and the cap for permitted team assistance has been removed. When originally announced, allocation money could not be used to supplement the salaries of U.S. or Canadian federation players, and players could not refuse federation status to access allocation money. The allocation rules were quietly changed in advance of the 2020 season to allow players to refuse federation status, but this change did not become public knowledge until after the end of the abbreviated season. In the 2021 season, clubs were explicitly allowed to use allocation money to sign federation players. In 2021, salary for unallocated players and the team salary cap both increased between 5 and 10 percent.

On December 13, 2021, as part of negotiations between U.S. Soccer and the union representing USWNT players, both agreed to end the allocation system for USWNT members, effective with the 2022 season. Starting in that season, the club salaries of all USWNT players will be paid directly by their NWSL clubs, and these players will be represented in their club employment by the NWSL Players Association (NWSLPA).

The NWSL and the NWSLPA, the union representing all players in the NWSL, jointly announced on January 31, 2022, that they had entered into the league's first official collective bargaining agreement, which will run through the 2026 season. Under this agreement, the minimum player salary increased to $35,000 in the 2022 season. Free agency will formally be added; players with six seasons of NWSL service will become unrestricted free agents in 2023, with the required service time reduced to five seasons from 2024. Additionally, starting in 2024, players with three seasons of NWSL service will receive restricted free agency. Also, should the league become profitable in any season from 2024 to 2026, the players will receive 10 percent of the league's broadcast revenues in the applicable season.

On August 25, 2022, the NWSLPA filed a grievance against the NWSL after the league announced the omission of 22 players from a list of 26 who would become eligible to negotiate free-agent contracts for the 2023 season. The league contended that the contracts of the 22 omitted players included one or more option years that each player's club must first decline to exercise by the deadline of November 15 before the player would be eligible for free agency. The players association contended that the contracts expired on their expiration date, and not the option exercise deadline. The players association expected the league to deny the grievance, and for the dispute to enter arbitration.

 All currency amounts are in United States dollars

Players' union

Active non-United States federation players, including unpaid amateur players, announced their formation of the NWSL Players Association (NWSLPA) on May 15, 2017, as the first step toward forming a union. The NWSL recognized the NWSLPA as the players' union on November 15, 2018.  the NWSLPA is led by civil rights attorney and former WPS players' union organizer Meghann Burke.

Prior to the 2022 season, the NWSLPA membership did not include United States federation players because those players were contracted to the US Soccer Federation for their NWSL play. With the abolition of the federation player system for 2022 and beyond, the NWSLPA now represents all players in the NWSL. The league and the NWSLPA entered into their first collective bargaining agreement in advance of that season.

League competitions

Championship and shield

The winner of the NWSL Championship, the final match of the NWSL Playoffs, determines that season's NWSL champion. In addition to receiving the championship trophy, the champion gets to add a star to the crest on its jersey. The playoffs, a single-elimination knockout tournament, are organized by the league in a format similar to other North American professional sports leagues. At the conclusion of the regular season, the top six teams in the standings earn a berth to the tournament; prior to 2021, only the top four teams qualified for the playoffs. The league also awards the NWSL Shield to the team with the best record (most points) at the end of the regular season. Like the playoff championship, it is recognized as a major trophy by the league.

The first NWSL Championship was played on September 1, 2013. , five teams have been crowned NWSL Champions: Portland Thorns FC (3), FC Kansas City (2), North Carolina Courage (2), Washington Spirit (1), and Western New York Flash (1). Four teams have claimed the NWSL Shield: North Carolina Courage (3), OL Reign (3), Portland Thorns FC (2), and Western New York Flash (1). The Reign were the first team to repeat as Shield winners in 2014 and 2015, and FC Kansas City were the first team to win consecutive championships in the same years, both times defeating the Reign. In 2018, the North Carolina Courage became the first team to win both the NWSL Shield and the NWSL Championship in the same season, a feat they repeated in 2019.

The trophies won by FC Kansas City and Western New York officially remain with those teams and were not transferred to the expansion or successor teams in Utah and North Carolina that were assigned their player-related assets. This was a non-issue for Utah Royals FC, which won no trophies before folding and having its player-related assets transferred to the franchise now known as the Kansas City Current.

Championship records 
Italics indicates a defunct team.

Challenge Cup 

In 2020, the COVID-19 pandemic prevented the regular season from starting. Instead the league played the newly announced Challenge Cup, a tournament-style competition, starting in late June, with all teams in a protective bubble in Salt Lake City. This made the NWSL the first professional team sport in the U.S. to restart during the pandemic. The Houston Dash won the inaugural Challenge Cup, topping the Chicago Red Stars in the final.

In November 2020, the NWSL announced that the Challenge Cup would become an annual league cup competition. The 2021 Challenge Cup was played in April and May prior to the regular season, with the Portland Thorns FC emerging as victors over NJ/NY Gotham FC in the final. The 2022 Challenge Cup was played from March to May of that year and was won by the North Carolina Courage.

Fall Series 

In September and October 2020, the league played the Fall Series, in which the nine teams were divided into three geographic "pods" to minimize travel during the COVID-19 pandemic; each team played a home-and-away round-robin within its pod. The Portland Thorns earned 12 points, the maximum possible, and won the Fall Series and the associated trophy, the Community Shield (named Verizon Community Shield for sponsorship reasons).

Broadcasting 

During the 2013–2016 seasons, the majority of league games were available for viewing via YouTube or via individual team's websites. Of the eight teams in the league during the inaugural season, the Boston Breakers were the only team that charged a fee for access to their broadcasts.

On April 18, 2013, NWSL signed a one-year agreement with Fox Sports 2 to televise six regular season games, the semifinal, and championship games. On May 28, 2014, the NWSL signed a one-year agreement with ESPN to televise nine games of the 2014 NWSL season. The matches included three regular season and three playoff matches on ESPN2, as well as 3 regular season games live-streamed on ESPN3. On June 30, 2015, the NWSL announced a one-year agreement with Fox Sports once more to cover ten matches. Three regular season and three playoff matches were televised on FS1, and four live-streamed on Fox Sports Go. The agreement was extended into 2016 under another one-year contract, covering three regular season matches and the three playoff matches, once again on FS1.

2017–2019: Lifetime and go90, ESPN
On February 2, 2017, the NWSL announced a three-year agreement with A&E Networks, in which the Lifetime network broadcast 22 regular-season matches as the NWSL Game of the Week at 4 p.m. ET on Saturday afternoons, as well as three post-season matches. This marked the first time that the NWSL had a weekly broadcast window throughout the entire season. As part of the deal, A&E Networks purchased a 25 percent equity stake in the NWSL and were granted two seats on the league's board. The company also formed a joint venture with the league known as NWSL Media to oversee the league's marketing and broadcast rights, and Lifetime became a league-wide kit sponsor for all players. This deal marked the first time Lifetime had broadcast sports since the WNBA in the late 1990s and early 2000s. Lifetime also streamed the game of the week in the United States via its website, and internationally in the NWSL website and iOS app. The remaining games were initially streamed exclusively by go90 in the United States under a digital rights deal with Verizon Communications, and through the NWSL website internationally.

The quality of the streams through go90 faced criticism, with sportswriters, users, and players and team staff criticizing the service for its inconsistent quality and arguing that the NWSL's growth could be harmed by go90's relative lack of reach and prominence when compared to YouTube. The Equalizer noted that the app was prone to crashing, did not have the same wide device support as YouTube, and that the telecasts themselves suffered from their own technical problems (such as poor camera angles and glitches with graphics), but that the streams were good when they worked. On May 19, 2017, the league announced that they would additionally stream games on the NWSL website and app in the U.S. until the technical issues with go90 were rectified.

After Houston Dash player Rachel Daly collapsed on the pitch after a match in Houston, on May 27 – where the heat index was reportedly over 100 degrees Fahrenheit – she was carried off on a stretcher and hospitalized for heat illness. League operations director Amanda Duffy subsequently announced that the NWSL Game of the Week matches, many of which were slated for the hottest parts of the day in humid cities such as Houston, Orlando, and Cary, North Carolina, would be rescheduled to allow for longer hydration breaks. Some Game of the Week matches changed to other venues, and teams not scheduled for television were granted more flexibility in rescheduling kickoffs for player safety. The league also adopted new procedures for addressing heat and rescheduling matches.

On June 6, 2018, it was announced that six Game of the Week matches through the remainder of the season would move to evening kickoffs and air on ESPNews (which is owned by a sister venture to A&E Networks), in an effort to ensure the safety of players, as well as improve attendance. Go90 shut down in July 2018; the remaining games not aired on television were moved back to the NWSL website for the remainder of the regular season and playoffs.

On February 20, 2019, the NWSL announced that A&E Networks had pulled out of its broadcasting agreement with the league one season early. A&E's stake in NWSL Media was given back to the league, but Lifetime remained a kit sponsor. NWSL president Amanda Duffy said the changes would give the league and its teams finer control over its media and sponsorship agreements, and expected to announce a new television rights deal soon. Verizon Media remained the U.S. digital rightsholder to the league, but the streams moved from go90 to the Yahoo! Sports website and apps.

The NWSL did not reach any national television deals before the start of the 2019 season, but after their opening match, the Chicago Red Stars reached their own television deal with the regional sports network NBC Sports Chicago. In July 2019, the NWSL announced that ESPN had acquired a 14-match package for the remainder of the season divided among ESPNews and ESPN2, including the semifinals and championship match.

2020–2023: CBS Sports 
In October 2019, the NWSL signed the agency Octagon to market its media rights. It was reported that Octagon was pursuing multi-year agreements of at least three years and stronger broadcaster commitments, as to help build an audience and discourage broadcasters from acquiring NWSL rights to ride the coattails of the U.S. national team and the FIFA Women's World Cup, but then "abandon" it afterward.

On March 11, 2020, the NWSL entered into a three-year media agreement with CBS Sports and the video game-oriented streaming service Twitch. For the 2020 season, CBS Sports planned to broadcast 87 matches (including the playoffs) split between CBS, CBS Sports Network, and CBS All Access (now Paramount+) in Canada and the United States, with the exact distribution among the channels subject to change, while Twitch planned to stream an additional 24 matches for free. Twitch also became the NWSL's international media rightsholder and streamed all matches outside Canada and the United States for free.

CBS Sports did not renew its rights beyond 2023 during its exclusive negotiating window. The league's contract with Twitch expired after the 2022 season, with the affected matches re-allocated to CBS platforms. The NWSL stated that matches would stream internationally on its website, while also reaching an agreement with TSN to hold Canadian media rights.

Statistical leaders 

Bold indicates active NWSL players.

NWSL awards 

Throughout the season, the league awards Player of the Month, Team of the Month, and Player of the Week awards to individual players, which are voted on by the media. At the end of each season, the league presents six annual awards for outstanding achievements, five of which are voted on by players, owners, general managers, coaches, media, and fans. The current (2022) holders of the annual awards are as follows:
 Golden Boot: Alex Morgan, San Diego Wave FC (15 goals)
 Most Valuable Player: Sophia Smith, Portland Thorns FC
 Rookie of the Year: Naomi Girma, San Diego Wave FC
 Goalkeeper of the Year: Kailen Sheridan, San Diego Wave FC
 Defender of the Year: Naomi Girma, San Diego Wave FC
 Coach of the Year: Casey Stoney, San Diego Wave FC

In addition, the league names a NWSL Best XI team and NWSL Second XI team, which are voted on by players, owners, general managers, coaches, media, and fans.

NWSL leadership 

Former general manager of the United States women's national soccer team Cheryl Bailey was announced by US Soccer President Sunil Gulati as the first commissioner of the NWSL on November 29, 2012. On November 18, 2014, she resigned after overseeing two seasons and the launch of the new professional league in less than five months ahead of the inaugural season.

On January 6, 2015, Jeff Plush, managing director of Colorado Rapids and a former MLS board member, was named as Bailey's successor. Plush oversaw the 2015 and 2016 seasons, including the Orlando Pride expansion, a broadcast partnership with A+E Networks (including the three-year broadcast deal with Lifetime television), and the sale of the Western New York Flash to North Carolina FC owner Stephen Malik and the team's relocation to North Carolina. During his tenure, former Louisville City FC president Amanda Duffy was hired in December 2016 as the NWSL's managing director of operations.

Plush resigned as commissioner on March 2, 2017, and the position remained vacant until 2020, although Duffy served as the public face of league management. On January 15, 2019, Duffy was promoted to president, the league's highest office.

On January 7, 2020, Amanda Duffy announced that she would leave the NWSL for a leadership position at the Orlando Pride on February 15, 2020. On February 27, 2020, the NWSL announced that Lisa Baird, chief marketing officer of the New York Public Radio, would become the league's commissioner on March 10, 2020. Baird resigned on October 1, 2021, during the Paul Riley controversy (see below). On October 18, 2021, the league hired Marla Messing as its Interim CEO. On April 20, 2022, Jessica Berman became Commissioner, overlapping with CEO Messing, who continued work until May 31.

Controversies 

On September 30, 2021, news was released that North Carolina Courage coach, Paul Riley was being accused of sexual coercion by multiple former players. Riley was promptly fired from his head coaching position and his coaching license was revoked.

Commissioner Lisa Baird responded to the report published in The Athletic, writing that "Concurrently, we are reporting these new allegations to the United States Center for SafeSport for investigation," but was ousted from her position the next day as she had not responded with sufficient action when the affected players had previously contacted her about the coercion. Riley maintains his innocence. Investigations into the incident, and into player safety more generally, were launched by the NWSL, the US Soccer Federation, and FIFA.

After a joint investigation by the NWSL and NWSLPA, Baird's replacement as commissioner, Jessica Berman, announced in January 2023 that four coaches, among them Riley, were banned for life from league employment. Several other coaches and executives received lesser discipline.

See also 

 List of foreign NWSL players
 Prominent women's sports leagues in the United States and Canada
 Professional sports leagues in the United States
 List of professional sports teams in the United States and Canada
 Women's soccer in the United States
 Women's professional sports

References

External links 

 

 
Sports leagues established in 2012
2012 establishments in the United States
1
Professional soccer leagues in the United States
Top level association football leagues in North America
Professional sports leagues in the United States